Buckeye is a former travel station about halfway along the Oroville–Quincy Highway in Plumas County, California, near the border with Butte County. The station stood as late as 1866, when it was noted in the Plumas County boundary survey.

References

Transportation in Plumas County, California